Claro is a popular Spanish and Italian surname. The name Claro derived from the Italian word chiari, which means "clear."  This nickname surname derived from an eke-name and reflects the physical attributes of its subject.  The Claro surname was likely used to refer to a person with a light complexion.

List of persons with the surname
 Adriano Correia (born 1984), Brazilian footballer
 Christophe Claro, a French writer and translator
 Giulio Claro (1525–1575), Italian jurist
 Manding Claro (born 1938), Filipino matinee idol
 Manuel Alberto Claro (born 1970), Danish cinematographer
 Nuno Claro (born 1977), Portuguese footballer

See also

Charo (name)

References

Italian-language surnames